This article shows Associação Académica de Coimbra – O.A.F.'s player statistics and all matches  that the club plays during the 2014–15 season. This season will be their 13th consecutive season in the top-flight of Portuguese football.

Competitions

Pre-season

Primeira Liga

League table

Results by round

Matches

Taça de Portugal

Third round

Taça da Liga

Third round

Players

Current squad
As of 1 June 2015.

Transfers

In

Out

References

External links
 Official club website 

2014-15
Portuguese football clubs 2014–15 season